Howard Walker (born December 10, 1954) is a Republican politician from Michigan who served a term in the Michigan Senate after serving three terms in the Michigan House of Representatives.

Prior to his election to the Legislature, Walker had a career in the oil and gas industry and later started and owned a land surveying business.

In August 2013, Walker announced his intention not to seek a second term in the Senate. The next month, after voting in favor of expanding Medicaid in Michigan under the Affordable Care Act, Walker was caught on tape at a Republican luncheon telling a local conservative radio host "screw you" after the host, Brian Sommerfield, called Walker a "weak Republican."

References

Living people
1954 births
Republican Party members of the Michigan House of Representatives
Republican Party Michigan state senators
People from Traverse City, Michigan
Michigan Technological University alumni
21st-century American politicians